Victoria is a song written by Magnus Uggla and Anders Henriksson and recorded by Uggla on the 1993 album Alla får påsar. The song was written for Uggla's wife Lolo's 35th birthday. While using references to the monarchy of Sweden, the lyrics deals with loving someone despite the other person not being perfect.

The song charted at Svensktoppen four seven weeks between 28 May-9 July 1994, peaking at second position. The song also charted at Trackslistan for three weeks.

References

External links

1993 songs
1994 singles
Songs written by Magnus Uggla
Magnus Uggla songs
Swedish-language songs
Songs written by Anders Henriksson (record producer)